Rayamangalam is a village (Grama punchyathu) in the Ernakulam district of Kerala state, India.

Location
Rayamangalam is close to the towns Kuruppampady     Pulluvazhy.keezhillam.valayanchirangara. Perumbavoor, Muvattupuzha and Kothamangalam.

Economy
Rayamangalam have a number of rock mining quarries and stone crushers. The surrounding hills are either planted with latex trees, or are being quarried. Another major activity is wood processing to produce plywood, matchsticks and other products. The Punchayath office is located at Nellimolam, on the Keezhillam- Kurichilakkodu road from Aluva Munnar Road (AM road).

Transportation
The main roads passes through this punchayath are MC road and Aluva - Munnar (AM road). A canal, part of the Periyar Valley Irrigation Project, originates from the Periyar River at Boothankettu passes through the heart of the village. The Koottumadam Temple here is known for the Thaipooyam festival of Subrahmanyan, along with the nearby Temple of Siva Perakkattu. In terms of health care, there are two hospitals, and one Primary Health Center at Nellimolam.

Kunnathnadu Tehsil
This village is part of Kunnathnadu taluk of Ernakulam district.  Other towns in this area include Kizhakkambalam, Kombanad, Mazhuvannoor, Rayamangalam and thiruvaniyoor.

Landmarks 
 Peniel Bible Seminary And Missionary Training Centre
 JAYAKERALAM HIGHER SECONDARY SCHOOL PULLUVAZHY
Govt.LP School Pulluvazhy
Pulluvazhy Public Library
St.Thomas School Pulluvazhy
Koottumadom Sree Subramanya swami Temple
Perakkattu Sree Mahadeva Temple
Karur Mahavishnu Temple
Moorukavu Bhagavathi Temple.
Ponnidayi Siva Temple.
St. Thomas Catholic Church Pulluvazhy
 St. Antony's Chapel and Sr Rany Maria Museum.
St. Thomas Jacobite Syrian church Parethumukal
st.Marys Jacobite  syrian  church nellimolam 
Jerusalem St. Peter's chapel Vaikara 
Gvt. UP School  Vaikara 
Ramapurath are Krishna swami Temple  Vaikara

Population 

According to the 2011 census of India, Rayamangalam has 6947 households. The literacy rate of the village is 88.34%.

References

External links 
Pulluvazhy  
 Kuruppampady

Villages in Kunnathunad taluk